MPI or Mpi may refer to:

Science and technology

Biology and medicine
 Magnetic particle imaging, an emerging non-invasive tomographic technique
 Myocardial perfusion imaging, a nuclear medicine procedure that illustrates the function of the heart muscle (myocardium)
 Mannose phosphate isomerase, an enzyme
 Mass psychogenic illness, the rapid spread of illness signs and symptoms affecting members of a cohesive group
 Master patient index, an index referencing all patients
 Multidimensional Pain Inventory, a pain medicine assessment questionnaire

Computing
 Marburg Picture Index, online database of photographs of artworks
 Merchant plug-in, software used to prevent credit card fraud on e-commerce sites
 Message Parsing Interpreter, a Lisp-like language on TinyMUCK
 Message Passing Interface, a communications protocol for parallel computation
 Multi-Point Interface, an automation programming protocol from Siemens
 Multipath interference, a physical effect which causes signal degradation in communication systems
 Multiple precision integer, a programming language type supporting arbitrary precision

Other science and technology
 Magnetic particle inspection, a non-destructive method used to detect defects in ferrous materials
 Multi point injection, fuel injection system for automobile engines
 Maximum potential intensity, a meteorology term associated with tropical cyclones

Companies and organizations
 Magnetic Peripherals Inc., a Control Data Corporation subsidiary renamed Imprimis and sold to Seagate Technology
 Manitoba Public Insurance, a non-profit Crown corporation based in Manitoba
 Markov Processes International, a global provider of investment research, analytics and technology
 Materials Processing Institute, a not-for-profit company providing industrial R&D services based in Teesside, UK
 Max Planck Institute, scientific research institutes in Germany
 Migration Policy Institute, a human migration research institute based in Washington, DC
 Mihajlo Pupin Institute, an ICT research institute based in Belgrade, Serbia
 Military Police Investigations, the minor crimes investigators of the US Army's Military Police
 Ministry for Primary Industries (New Zealand), a government agency in New Zealand
 Ministry of Planning and Investment (Vietnam)
 Mission Pictures International, a foreign sales, finance, and distribution company
 MotivePower, a locomotive manufacturer and rebuilder
 Movimiento Pro-Independencia, the Puerto Rican Pro-independence Movement
 Moving Picture Institute, an American non-profit organization and film production company
 MPI Media Group, an American home entertainment company

Other uses
 Mpi language, a Loloish language of Thailand
 Mpi people, an ethnic group from Thailand
 Mariposa-Yosemite Airport (FAA location identifier), Mariposa County, California, US
 Milanka Price Index, one of the principal stock indices of the Colombo Stock Exchange in Sri Lanka
 Multidimensional Poverty Index, used by the UNDP

Language and nationality disambiguation pages